Gong Lei may refer to:

 Gong Lei (footballer) (born 1965), Chinese football coach and former player
 Gong Lei (sailor) (born 1983), Chinese sailor